Astraspis ('star shield') is an extinct genus of primitive jawless fish from the Ordovician of Central North America including the Harding Sandstone of Colorado and Bighorn Mountains of Wyoming. It is also known from  Bolivia. It is related to other Ordovician fishes, such as the South American Sacabambaspis, and the Australian Arandaspis.

Description

The specimen from North America (described by Sansom et al., 1997) is to have had relatively large, laterally-positioned eyes and a series of eight gill openings on each side. The specimen was generally oval in cross-section. The protective bony plates covering the animal were composed of aspidin (chemically similar to modern shark's teeth), covered by tubercles composed of dentine.<ref>Sansom IJ, Smith MP, Smith MM and Turner P (1997) "Astraspis: The anatomy and histology of an Ordovician fish" Palaeontology, 40 (3): 625–642.</ref> It is from these tubercles (which are generally star-shaped) that the name 'Astraspis' (literally "star-shield") is derived.

References

Other sources
Michael J. Benton, Vertebrate Palaeontology'', 3rd edition, 2005

External links 
 Palaeos' Pteraspidomorphi

Pteraspidomorphi genera
Ordovician jawless fish
Late Ordovician animals
Ordovician fish of North America
Prehistoric fish of South America
Fossils of Bolivia
Fossil taxa described in 1892